Danais is a genus of flowering plants in the family Rubiaceae. Most species are native to Madagascar; at least three others are distributed in Tanzania, Comoros, and the Mascarene Islands.

These are climbing plants with flowers in shades of white, yellow, orange, red, blue, or purple. The flowers have very slender tubes and are adapted for pollination by moths, such as hawkmoths. The plants often have an unpleasant scent, but some flowers have a sweet fragrance.

Species

Danais andribensis Homolle - Madagascar
Danais aurantiaca Homolle - Madagascar
Danais baronii Homolle - Madagascar
Danais breviflora Baker - Madagascar
Danais brickavillensis J.-F.Leroy ex Puff & Buchner - Madagascar
Danais capituliformis Homolle - Madagascar
Danais cernua Baker - Madagascar
Danais comorensis Drake - Mayotte
Danais coronata (Pers.) Steud. - Madagascar
Danais corymbosa Balf.f. - Rodrigues (possibly extinct, last collected in 1874)
Danais dauphinensis Cavaco - Madagascar
Danais distinctinervia Homolle - Madagascar
Danais fragrans (Lam.) Pers. - Madagascar, Mauritius, Réunion
Danais hispida Baker - Madagascar
Danais humblotii Homolle - Comoros, Madagascar
Danais ligustrifolia Baker - Madagascar
Danais longipedunculata Homolle - Madagascar
Danais magna Puff & Buchner - Madagascar
Danais microcarpa Baker - Madagascar
Danais nigra Homolle - Madagascar
Danais pauciflora Baker - Madagascar
Danais pubescens Baker - Madagascar
Danais rhamnifolia Baker - Madagascar
Danais rubra Puff & Buchner - Madagascar
Danais sulcata Pers. - Mauritius
Danais terminalis Boivin ex Drake - Madagascar
Danais tsaratananensis Homolle - Madagascar
Danais verticillata Baker - Madagascar
Danais vestita Baker - Madagascar
Danais volubilis Baker - Madagascar
Danais xanthorrhoea (K.Schum.) Bremek. - Tanzania

References

External links
Danais in the World Checklist of Rubiaceae

Rubiaceae genera
Danaideae
Flora of Africa